Jennifer Sullivan (born 1945) is a Welsh writer for children and adults, and a former literary critic. She is best known for her Magic Apostrophe series of children's fantasy books. She is a recipient of the Tir na n-Og Award.

Biography
Sullivan was born in Cardiff, Wales, to Londoner Frederick Anderson (1900–1993), an electrician, and Phyllis (1905–2009), a short story writer.

Sullivan worked as a book critic for some years while her children were growing up. She has always written fiction, and during early professional years wrote mainly adult short stories. She has written a number of popular books, mostly suitable for 7–12 year olds, with Welsh themes incorporated into their story lines. She frequently visits primary schools in Wales to open events and carry out book signings.

Having lived in Raglan, Monmouthshire most of her life, Sullivan now resides in Brittany, France. She is married with three adult daughters, Kirsty, Tanith and Stephanie. Tanith is the name of a character from the Gwydion Trilogy.

In 1993, Sullivan was awarded the Irma Chilton Bursary, which is presented to aspiring children's novelists by the Welsh Arts Council.

Tiron's Secret Journal won the 2006 Tir na n-Og Award for the best English-language book of the year with a Welsh background. Sullivan won the award for the second time in 2012 with Full Moon.

Works

Magic Apostrophe series

The Magic Apostrophe
The Island of Summer
Dragonson
Who, Me?
Me and My Big Mouth
Dragons – and Decisions
Nobody Asked Me!
What Part of 'No' Don't You Understand?
Tree of Light
The Jellyfish, the Dragon and the Witch (stand alone book)

Gwydion series
Set prior to The Magic Apostrophe, before Gwydion meets Tan'ith
Gwydion and the Flying Wand
Magic Maldwyn
Betsan the Brave
Gwydion's Quest

Back End of Nowhere series
The Back End of Nowhere
Nowhere Again

Llancaiach fawr books
Tirion's Secret Journal
Troublesome Thomas

Underground railway books
Full Moon
Totally Batty

The Aled books
The Great Cake Bake
The Great Granny Hunt

Silver Fox series
Adult series set during Owain Glyndŵr's War of Independence
Silver Fox - It Behins
Silver Fox - The Paths Diverge
A third book is planned
Non-series booksFollowing Blue WaterMacsen and the PiratesA Guardian What?Celtic HeroinesC'mon, Cymru! (poetry)

Picture booksSiôn and the Bargain BeeTwo Left Feet (in Welsh and English)The Caterpillar That Couldn't (in Welsh and English)A Little Bit of Mischief'' (in Welsh and English)

References

External links

2002 interview at Welsh Books Council

 (as of July 2015, but 3 recordings are probably another Jenny Sullivan)

1945 births
20th-century Welsh women writers
21st-century Welsh women writers
21st-century Welsh writers
Welsh children's writers
Welsh literary critics
British women literary critics
Welsh short story writers
Writers from Cardiff
Date of birth missing (living people)
Welsh women critics
British women children's writers
British women short story writers
Living people
20th-century British short story writers
21st-century British short story writers